The Bahia interior forests is an ecoregion of eastern Brazil. It is part of the larger Atlantic forests biome complex, and lies between the Bahia coastal forests and the dry shrublands and savannas of Brazil's interior.

Setting
The Bahia interior forests extend north to the São Francisco River, where they lie much closer to the coast, and are bounded on the west by the dry Caatinga shrublands. Moving south, the forests extend further inland to the Rio Paraíba do Sul, Rio Preto, and Rio Grande, which form the boundary with the Alto Paraná Atlantic forests to the southwest.

Flora
Atlantic forest in Minas Gerais, interior Bahia and southern Espírito Santo, according to IBGE, consists of a semi-deciduous or deciduous forest. In this ecoregion is found a highly threatened species, the "Brazilian rosewood" (Dalbergia nigra).

Fauna

This ecoregion is poorly known. Recently, a new primate species was described, the Coimbra Filho's titi, and other primate, the Northern muriqui is endemic of Bahia interior forests ecoregion.

Conservation and threats

Bahia interior forest is one of the most modified ecoregions in Atlantic forest region. Most forests remnants has less than 10 km², and even these are currently under strong pressure from anthropogenic activities, as fires, illegal deforestation and predatory hunting. Less than 2 percent of Bahia interior forests are  protected as conservation units. The largest forest remnant of this ecoregion is the Rio Doce State Park, with 359 km² of area.

References

Atlantic Forest
Neotropical tropical and subtropical moist broadleaf forests
Ecoregions of Brazil
Forests of Brazil
.
Environment of Bahia
Environment of Espírito Santo
Environment of Minas Gerais
Environment of Rio de Janeiro (state)
Environment of Sergipe

Geography of Bahia
Geography of Espírito Santo
Geography of Minas Gerais
Geography of Rio de Janeiro (state)
Geography of Sergipe
Endemic Bird Areas